The 1959 Macdonald Brier, the Canadian men's national curling championship, was held from March 2 to 6, 1959 at the Colisée de Québec in Quebec City, Quebec. This was the second time that Quebec City had hosted the Brier, with the previous time being in 1942. A total of 16,000 fans attended the event. The attendance was affected by a raging blizzard on the final day in which there were fewer than a 1,000 fans that attended that day.

Both Team Alberta and Team Saskatchewan finished round robin play tied for first with 9-1 records, necessitating a tiebreaker playoff for the Brier championship between the two teams. Saskatchewan, who was skipped by Ernie Richardson captured the Brier Tankard after defeating Alberta 12–6 in the tiebreaker. This was the second time in which Saskatchewan had captured the Brier championship and the first of four Brier championships in which Ernie Richardson would skip.

Beginning with the 1959 Brier, the Brier champion would represent Canada in the Scotch Cup. Richardson's rink would go on to defeat Scotland 5 games to none in the first ever Scotch Cup in Scotland.

Event Summary 
For most of the 1959 Brier, it was looking like Saskatchewan was going to claim the Brier Tankard as they sat unbeaten at 7-0 heading into the Thursday evening draw. Alberta and Manitoba were both sitting at 6-1 while British Columbia sitting at 5–2 with an outside shot. That evening, Saskatchewan kept their undefeated record alive by eliminating BC in convincing fashion 13–5. Alberta would beat winless Quebec 13-8 while Manitoba hopes for a Brier championship took a big hit as they lost to Prince Edward Island 10–8.

Heading into the final day, Saskatchewan was 8–0 with Alberta sitting at 7-1 and Manitoba needing some help with a 6–2 record. The Friday morning draw would feature a matchup between Alberta and Manitoba with Saskatchewan facing winless Quebec. Saskatchewan would have a chance of clinching the Brier championship with one game remaining with a win combined with a Alberta loss.

A raging blizzard struck Quebec City on the final day of competition causing the attendance at the Colisée to be a lot smaller than usual for the final day of the Brier. In the Friday morning draw, Saskatchewan would hold off Quebec 8-6 thus eliminating Manitoba from championship contention with Alberta managing to stay alive with a 10–8 win over Manitoba.

The final draw of the round robin on Friday afternoon had a lot of suspense. A Saskatchewan win would make them the eleventh team to finish a Brier unbeaten while Alberta needed a win against Northern Ontario and a Saskatchewan loss to Manitoba to force a tiebreaker playoff that evening. In the Alberta/Northern Ontario matchup, Alberta jumped out to a 4–1 lead after three ends. Northern Ontario would tie the game at 4 with one in the fourth and a steal of two in the fifth. Despite this, Alberta would pull away outscoring Northern Ontario 7–2 in the last seven ends for an 11–6 victory. Now all Alberta needed was some help from Manitoba and they got just that. Even though the Manitoba/Saskatchewan game was back-and-forth as it was died at 4 through seven ends, Manitoba would score 3 in the eighth and even though Saskatchewan cut the lead to 7-6 after nine ends, Manitoba would go on to win 9–7, thus necessitating a tiebreaker playoff between Alberta and Saskatchewan for the Brier championship.

For the second consecutive year, the Brier would be decided in a tiebreaker. With less than 1,000 people in attendance due to the ongoing blizzard, the few fans in attendance watched a final saw Saskatchewan jump out to a 7–3 lead through the halfway point. Saskatchewan would dash any hopes of bringing the Brier Tankard back to Alberta as Saskatchewan put the game away for good with 3 in the seventh end as they cruised to a 12–6 victory to capture the Brier championship. By capturing the Brier Tankard, the Ernie Richardson rink also secured a spot in the 1959 Scotch Cup against Scotland for the first ever World Curling Championship.

Teams
The teams are listed as follows:

Round-robin standings

Round-robin results
All draw times are listed in Eastern Time (UTC-05:00)

Draw 1
Monday, March 2 3:00 PM

Draw 2
Monday, March 2 8:00 PM

Draw 3
Tuesday, March 3 9:30 AM

Draw 4
Tuesday, March 3 2:30 PM

Draw 5
Wednesday, March 4 3:00 PM

Draw 6
Wednesday, March 4 8:00 PM

Draw 7
Thursday, March 5 9:00 AM

Draw 8
Thursday, March 5 3:00 PM

Draw 9
Thursday, March 5 8:00 PM

Draw 10
Friday, March 6 9:30 AM

Draw 11
Friday, March 6 3:00 PM

Playoff 
Friday, March 6

References

External links 
 Video: 

Macdonald Brier, 1959
Macdonald Brier, 1959
The Brier
Curling competitions in Quebec City
Macdonald Brier
Macdonald Brier
20th century in Quebec City